A mystery watch (same applies for mystery clock) is a generic term used in horology to describe a timepiece whose working is not easily deducible, because it seems to have no movement at all, or the hands do not seem to be connected to any movement, etc.

One example is a type of mechanical watch where the movement is transmitted to the hands through a transparent crystal toothed wheel.

As an item of historical/horological value, it is preserved in various museum collections, such as the British Museum, the German Clock Museum, the International Museum of Horology, the Musée d'Horlogerie of Le Locle (Switzerland), the Musée d'art et d'histoire de Neuchâtel, the U.S. National Watch and Clock Museum, and the Vienna Clock and Watch Museum.

See also

 List of watch manufacturers
 Dollar watch

References

External links
 Article published in Antiquarian Horology on the first transparent watch
 Video of the first transparent watch at the National Watch & Clock Museum, USA
 United States patent of the first transparent watch, 3 pages 
 Record of the first transparent watch at the NWCM
 Hamilton Mystery watch, early 1960s

Watches
Clocks